Christopher Marsden (born 3 January 1969) is an English former footballer who played in the Football League and Premier League for Sheffield United, Huddersfield Town, Coventry City, Wolverhampton Wanderers, Notts County, Stockport County, Birmingham City, Southampton and Sheffield Wednesday, and in the Korean K-League for Busan I'Park. He led Southampton to the 2003 FA Cup Final, which they lost 1–0 to Arsenal.

Playing career
Marsden was born in Sheffield and started his career with Sheffield United, going on to play for Huddersfield Town, Coventry City, Wolves, Notts County, Stockport County, Birmingham City, Southampton and Busan I'Park in South Korea.

He ended his career playing for Football League One club Sheffield Wednesday.

Marsden made 424 appearances in the Football League and scored 22 goals as a left footed midfield player and occasional defender. He first made an impression with Huddersfield Town in the early 1990s before successful spells at Stockport County and Birmingham City.

Southampton
Marsden played seven games in the Premiership for Coventry City in 1993 but did not play in the top flight again for a further six years (by which time he was 30) when he was brought to Southampton by then manager Dave Jones.

He captained Southampton in the 2003 FA Cup Final, which they lost 1–0 to Arsenal.

Sheffield Wednesday
After a short and unsuccessful spell at Busan I'Park, Marsden was snapped up on a free transfer by Chris Turner for Sheffield Wednesday. However, his career was cut short by a hamstring injury that forced him to retire.

Honours
Southampton
 FA Cup runner-up: 2002–03

Stockport County
 Second Division runner-up: 1996–97

Individual
PFA Team of the Year: 1991–92 Third Division, 1996–97 Second Division

References
General

Specific

External links
Chris Marsden Career Profile

Fansite

1969 births
Living people
Footballers from Sheffield
Association football midfielders
English footballers
Sheffield United F.C. players
Huddersfield Town A.F.C. players
Coventry City F.C. players
Wolverhampton Wanderers F.C. players
Notts County F.C. players
Stockport County F.C. players
Birmingham City F.C. players
Southampton F.C. players
Busan IPark players
Sheffield Wednesday F.C. players
English Football League players
Premier League players
K League 1 players
English expatriate footballers
Expatriate footballers in South Korea
FA Cup Final players